Bill Schumacher was a hydroplane driver.  He is best known for driving the Unlimited Hydroplane Miss Bardahl to two American Power Boat Association Gold Cup championships in 1967 and 1968.

References

American motorboat racers
Living people
Year of birth missing (living people)
Place of birth missing (living people)
20th-century American people